Senyah is an unincorporated community located in north Volusia County, Florida, United States. Its name is Haynes spelled backwards. Haynes was the developer's last name.

References

Unincorporated communities in Volusia County, Florida
Unincorporated communities in Florida